The Mayi River, sometimes spelled Mayi He,  Mayihe River, also known as Mayan River (蚂蜒河), is a river in Heilongjiang Province, People's Republic of China, and is an importanttributary of the Songhua River.

Mayi River originates in the Zhangguangcai Ridge (张广才岭) area of the Changbai Mountains, flows west to Shangzhi Town, Shangzhi City, and curves to the northeast, through Yanshou County, Fangzheng County, and is injected into the right bank of the Songhua River in Songnan Township (松南乡), Fangzheng County. The total length of the river is 341 kilometers, and the total drainage area is 10,727 square kilometers.

References

Rivers of China
Rivers of Heilongjiang